The 2016–17 Kosovar Cup was the football knockout competition of Kosovo in the 2016–17 season.

First round
These matches were played on 29 June 2016.

|-

|}

Second round
These matches were played on 25 & 26 October 2016. 

|-

|}

Third round
These matches were played on 23 November 2016. 

|-

|}

Fourth round
These matches were played on 3 December 2016. 

|-

|}

Fifth Round
These matches were played on 18, 19, and 21 February 2017. 

|-

|}

Quarter-finals

The matches were played on 15 and 16 March 2017.

|-

|}

Semi-finals

These matches will be played on 29 March and 19 April 2017.

First leg

Second leg

Final

The final of the Kosovar Cup for this season will be played on May 31, 2017 at the Riza Lushta Stadium.

References

Cup
Kosovar Cup seasons
Kosovo